Klovner I Kamp is a Norwegian hip-hop group from Tåsen in Oslo.  Formed in 1994, at the time as a duo with Alis (Aslak Hartberg) and Dr. S (Sveinung Eide). Shortly after the band got a new member, "Dansken" ("The Dane", being born in Denmark), Esben Selvig. Klovner I Kamp was a trio for several years, but in 2000, "Goldfinger" or "Finger'n" (Thomas Gullestad) and «Micro» Simen Rex joined as their DJ and masseur.

Klovner I Kamp won the Spellemannprisen for hip hop in 2001.

The band had their final concert at Rockefeller, 1 September 2006. On 4 July 2009, they played a reunion concert at the Roskilde Festival in Denmark.

Discography

Albums

Singles

References

Norwegian hip hop groups
Musical groups established in 1994
1994 establishments in Norway
Musical groups disestablished in 2006
2006 disestablishments in Norway
Musical groups from Oslo